Close to the Bone is the second studio album by the Tom Tom Club that was released in 1983. The Tom Tom Club's musicians were: Wally Badarou, Tyrone Downie, Chris Frantz, Roddy Frantz, Rupert Hine, Raymond Jones, Steve Scales, Steven Stanley, Alex Weir; and sisters Lani, Laura and Tina Weymouth. The album was released on compact disc for the first time on May 19, 2009, as a part of a two-CD deluxe package with the band's first album, Tom Tom Club, as part of Universal Music's deluxe editions series.

Singles
Two tracks from the album were released as singles, "Pleasure of Love" and "The Man with the 4-Way Hips", the latter reaching number 82 on the UK Singles Chart in August 1983.

Track listing
All tracks composed by the Tom Tom Club
 "Pleasure of Love" – 6:33
 "On the Line Again" – 4:56
 "This Is a Foxy World" – 3:39
 "Bamboo Town" – 3:56
 "The Man With the 4-Way Hips" – 5:48
 "Measure Up" – 5:05
 "Never Took a Penny" – 3:33
 "Atsababy! (Life Is Great)" – 4:02
Bonus tracks:
 "The Man with the 4-Way Hips" (extended version)
 "Pleasure of Love" (instrumental)
 "The Man With the 4-Way Hips" (dub version)
 "Yella" (Mr. Yella Version)

Personnel
Tom Tom Club
Tina Weymouth – bass, vocals
Chris Frantz – drums, vocals
Alex Weir – guitar
Wally Badarou – keyboards
Tyrone Downie – keyboards
Raymond Jones – keyboards
Rupert Hine – keyboards
Steve Scales – percussion
Lani Weymouth – vocals
Laura Weymouth – vocals
Steven Stanley
Roddy Frantz
Technical personnel
James Rizzi – cover illustration
Steven Stanley, Benjamin Armbrister, Frank Hanna, Kendall Stubbs – recording, mixing

Chart performance
The album spent 13 weeks on the US Billboard album charts and reached its peak position of number 73 in early September 1983.

References

Tom Tom Club albums
1983 albums
Sire Records albums
Island Records albums
A&M Records albums
Albums produced by Chris Frantz
Albums produced by Tina Weymouth
Albums produced by Steven Stanley